Bring It! is the eleventh studio album by the Japanese pop duo PUFFY, released in June 2009 by Kioon Music.

Three singles were released from the album, being "All Because of You," "My Story," and "Hiyori Hime".

Track listing

Charts

Weekly charts

References

Puffy AmiYumi albums
2009 albums